"Subways" is a song by Australian electronic music group the Avalanches. The song was released as the third single from their second studio album, Wildflower (2016), on 22 June 2016. The song rose to number 81 on the Australian ARIA Charts.

Composition
"Subways" has been described as a disco-funk song. Like the other tracks on Wildflower, it is a mainly sample-based track, which samples "Warm Ride" by the Bee Gees, performed by Graham Bonnet, as well as "Black Water" by Patrick Simmons. The main vocals of the song are pulled from a 1980 song titled "Subways" by Chandra Oppenheim, who was 12 years old at the time of its release. She had not previously heard about the Avalanches until they approached her regarding the sample. Featuring strings throughout, the song had been compared to the group's previous work by Spin and described as featuring a "grooving bassline" and "richly-textured sonic layers" by Rolling Stone.

Track listing.

Charts

References

2016 singles
2016 songs
The Avalanches songs
Modular Recordings singles